Ibrahim El-Attar (born 22 February 1928) was an Egyptian rower. He competed in the men's coxed four event at the 1952 Summer Olympics.

References

1928 births
Living people
Egyptian male rowers
Olympic rowers of Egypt
Rowers at the 1952 Summer Olympics
Place of birth missing (living people)